Vartiania zaratustra is a moth in the family Cossidae. It is found in Iran, Iraq and Oman.

References

Natural History Museum Lepidoptera generic names catalog

Cossinae